Jared Hamman (born March 7, 1982) is an American mixed martial artist that competes in the World Series of Fighting's Middleweight division. A professional competitor since 2006, he has also formerly competed for the UFC,  Strikeforce and ShoXC.

Background
Hamman is originally from Atascadero, California, and was raised by his single mother along with his older brother, Loren. Hamman, who was expelled from a private school, later attended Atascadero High School where he was a standout athlete in football, swimming, track and field, and also competed in wrestling for one year. Hamman continued with football as a defensive end for the University of Redlands, winning All-Conference honors. He also worked as a teacher and an assistant coach before pursuing mixed martial arts.

Mixed martial arts career

Early career
Hamman began training in mixed martial arts when he was 22 years old at the Unbreakable Gym under Brian Warren in November 2005 and made his professional debut in 2006. He began training with Henry Akins, Antoni Hardonk, and Vladimir Matyushenko of Dynamix MMA in 2010. Hamman received national attention while fighting for the now-defunct EliteXC under their ShoXC banner on the cable network Showtime, most notably for a two-fight series against Po'ai Suganuma.

Ultimate Fighting Championship
Hamman made his UFC debut against Alexander Gustafsson on November 14, 2009, at UFC 105. Hamman lost via first-round KO.

After that, Hamman faced Rodney Wallace on March 27, 2010, at UFC 111. He won the fight via unanimous decision and both fighters were awarded Fight of the Night honors.

Hamman was defeated by Kyle Kingsbury via unanimous decision on September 15, 2010, at UFC Fight Night 22. However, Hamman was awarded his second Fight of the Night honors.

For his next fight, Hamman dropped to Middleweight and faced CB Dollaway at UFC on Versus 5. He was successful in his middleweight debut, winning via TKO at 3:38 of round 2.

Hamman faced Costas Philippou on December 10, 2011, at UFC 140. He lost via KO in the 1st round.

Hamman was expected to face Kyle Noke on March 3, 2012, at UFC on FX 2. However, he withdrew from the fight due to an undisclosed injury, and was replaced by UFC newcomer Andrew Craig.

Hamman next faced Michael Kuiper on August 11, 2012, at UFC 150. Hamman lost via TKO in the second round.

After over a year out, Hamman faced Magnus Cedenblad on August 31, 2013, at UFC 164. He lost the fight via guillotine choke submission in the first round. After the loss, Hamman was released from the UFC.

World Series of Fighting
After over a year away from the sport, Hamman signed with the World Series of Fighting. He debuted for the company on October 11, 2014, in Edmonton, Alberta, Canada against former The Ultimate Fighter Nations competitor Luke Harris. Hamman won the fight via TKO in the first round.

Championships and accomplishments
Ultimate Fighting Championship
Fight of the Night (Two times)  vs. Rodney Wallace, Kyle Kingsbury

Mixed martial arts record

|-
| Win
| align=center| 14–6
| Luke Harris
| TKO (punches)
| WSOF 14
| 
| align=center| 1
| align=center| 2:27
| Edmonton, Alberta, Canada
|Returned to Light Heavyweight.
|-
| Loss
| align=center| 13–6
| Magnus Cedenblad
| Technical Submission (guillotine choke)
| UFC 164
| 
| align=center| 1
| align=center| 0:57
| Milwaukee, Wisconsin, United States
| 
|-
| Loss
| align=center| 13–5
| Michael Kuiper
| TKO (punches)
| UFC 150
| 
| align=center| 2
| align=center| 2:16
| Denver, Colorado, United States
| 
|-
| Loss
| align=center| 13–4
| Costas Philippou
| KO (punches)
| UFC 140
| 
| align=center| 1
| align=center| 3:11
| Toronto, Ontario, Canada
| 
|-
| Win
| align=center| 13–3
| CB Dollaway
| TKO (punches)
| UFC Live: Hardy vs. Lytle
| 
| align=center| 2
| align=center| 3:38
| Milwaukee, Wisconsin, United States
| 
|-
| Loss
| align=center| 12–3
| Kyle Kingsbury
| Decision (unanimous)
| UFC Fight Night: Marquardt vs. Palhares
| 
| align=center| 3
| align=center| 5:00
| Austin, Texas, United States
| 
|-
| Win
| align=center| 12–2
| Rodney Wallace
| Decision (unanimous)
| UFC 111
| 
| align=center| 3
| align=center| 5:00
| Newark, New Jersey, United States
| 
|-
| Loss
| align=center| 11–2
| Alexander Gustafsson
| KO (punches)
| UFC 105
| 
| align=center| 1
| align=center| 0:41
| Manchester, England
| 
|-
| Win
| align=center| 11–1
| Po'ai Suganuma
| TKO (punches)
| ShoXC: Hamman vs. Suganuma 2
| 
| align=center| 1
| align=center| 2:34
| Friant, California, United States
| 
|-
| Win
| align=center| 10–1
| Ibrahim Ibrahim
| TKO (punches)
| California Cage Championships
| 
| align=center| 1
| align=center| 2:00
| Maywood, California, United States
| 
|-
| Loss
| align=center| 9–1
| Po'ai Suganuma
| KO (flying knee)
| ShoXC: Elite Challenger Series
| 
| align=center| 1
| align=center| 0:15
| Friant, California, United States
| 
|-
| Win
| align=center| 9–0
| Aaron Rosa
| Submission (rear-naked choke)
| ShoXC: Elite Challenger Series
| 
| align=center| 2
| align=center| 1:46
| Santa Ynez, California, United States
| 
|-
| Win
| align=center| 8–0
| Travis Wiuff
| KO (punches)
| IFC: Global Domination 2
| 
| align=center| 2
| align=center| N/A
| Marksville, Louisiana, United States
| 
|-
| Win
| align=center| 7–0
| Rogent Lloret
| KO (punches)
| IFC: Global Domination 2
| 
| align=center| 2
| align=center| N/A
| Marksville, Louisiana, United States
| 
|-
| Win
| align=center| 6–0
| Paul Mince
| TKO (punches)
| Chaos in the Cage 2
| 
| align=center| 2
| align=center| 0:20
| San Bernardino, California, United States
| 
|-
| Win
| align=center| 5–0
| Rafael Real
| Submission (armbar)
| Beatdown in Bakersfield
| 
| align=center| 1
| align=center| 1:41
| Bakersfield, California, United States
| 
|-
| Win
| align=center| 4–0
| Ricardo Arrivabeive
| TKO (punches)
| Pangea Fights 2: Live MMA
| 
| align=center| 2
| align=center| 2:14
| Hollywood, California, United States
| 
|-
| Win
| align=center| 3–0
| Randal Limond
| TKO (punches)
| California Xtreme Fighting 2
| 
| align=center| 1
| align=center| 0:36
| Upland, California, United States
| 
|-
| Win
| align=center| 2–0
| Scott Graham
| TKO (punches)
| Strikeforce: Revenge
| 
| align=center| 2
| align=center| 1:36
| San Jose, California, United States
| 
|-
| Win
| align=center| 1–0
| Ray Lizama
| TKO (cut)
| California Xtreme Fighting 1
| 
| align=center| 2
| align=center| N/A
| Upland, California, United States
|

References

External links

Official UFC Profile

American male mixed martial artists
1982 births
Living people
Mixed martial artists from California
Light heavyweight mixed martial artists
Middleweight mixed martial artists
University of Redlands alumni
People from Atascadero, California
People from San Luis Obispo County, California
Sportspeople from Southern California
Ultimate Fighting Championship male fighters